Chellappan was an Indian screenwriter and director who was active in Malayalam cinema until the mid-1990s. He made films with Mammootty.

Personal life
He studied at Pandhalam Poly Technique. He was married to Geetha. They had two children, Prathiba and Anandu.

Filmography

A complete list of his films are available from the Malayalam Movie Database

References

Malayalam film directors
Malayalam screenwriters
2015 deaths
Screenwriters from Kerala
20th-century Indian film directors
20th-century Indian dramatists and playwrights
Artists from Kollam